Cyntoia Brown Long (née Brown; born January 29, 1988) is an American author and speaker who was convicted of murder and robbery at the age of 16. Brown, who was a victim of child sex trafficking at the time of the incident, claimed that Johnny Allen had paid her $150 to have sex with him, and that she feared for her life during their encounter, leading her to shoot him. Prosecutors argued that Brown killed Allen while he was sleeping in order to rob him. Brown was found guilty of robbing and murdering Allen and was sentenced to life imprisonment.

She would have been eligible for parole at the age of 67. After renewed interest in her case in 2013, Tennessee Governor Bill Haslam commuted her original sentence to 15 years and Brown was released on August 7, 2019. Her story is detailed in the 2011 documentary Me Facing Life: Cyntoia's Story and in her memoir, Free Cyntoia: My Search for Redemption in the American Prison System. Her fight for freedom from prison is documented in the Netflix special Murder to Mercy: The Cyntoia Brown Story (2020).

Early life 
Cyntoia Denise Brown was born at Fort Campbell, Kentucky, on January 29, 1988. Her father is unknown. Her biological mother, Georgina Mitchell, drank alcohol during her pregnancy. Brown's defense attorneys would later claim that this caused her to develop fetal alcohol spectrum disorder. Following Brown's birth, Mitchell began to use crack cocaine. Unable to care for her infant daughter, Mitchell placed the child up for adoption.

Although raised in a loving home, Brown dropped out of elementary school and eventually began to have encounters with the juvenile court system. She spent time with the state's Department of Children's Services between April 2001 and September 2003 after committing "crimes against a person, and crimes against property," according to spokeswoman Carla Aaron. While in custody of the DCS, Brown spent two years in DCS facilities, including a year at Woodland Hills Youth Development Center in Nashville. She fled these facilities several times, eventually ending up as a runaway on the streets of Nashville in August 2004.
While a runaway, Brown met Garion L. McGlothen (also known by the street name Kut-Throat, often abbreviated to Kut or Cut), who began trafficking Brown. During this time, she lived at an InTown Suites hotel. Brown supported McGlothen and herself via involuntary prostitution as a victim of domestic minor sex trafficking. According to Brown, McGlothen threatened, beat, and raped her on multiple occasions.

Murder of Johnny Allen 

On the night of August 6, 2004, 16-year-old Brown met 43-year-old Johnny Michael Allen in the parking lot of a Sonic Drive-In on Murfreesboro Road in Nashville, Tennessee. Allen was a real estate agent. He also was a youth pastor and a Sunday school teacher and had started a homeless ministry at a local Baptist church. 

According to a detective on the case, Allen asked her if she was hungry and if she was "up for any action." The detective asserted that Brown answered yes to both questions and accepted Allen's offer to take her to his house. Brown and Allen ordered dinner and Allen drove the pair to his home. At a later hearing, Brown testified that she agreed to have sex with Allen for $150, but claimed that they never actually engaged in sexual intercourse. Allen's friends and family denied that he had tried to solicit Brown for sex, instead claiming that he was trying to help her. However, the lead prosecutor in the case, Jeff Burks stipulated that Allen picked Brown up to pay her for sex, stating, “That was a fact from start to finish.” 

In court documents, another minor who was a waitress at a local restaurant claimed that she and the other young teens at the restaurant felt uncomfortable whenever they had to serve Allen. The waitress said that he would hit on the teens regularly.

At some point during the encounter, Brown shot Allen in the back of the head using her .40-caliber handgun. She then stole $172 from Allen's wallet and two of his firearms and fled the scene in Allen's truck. Brown left Allen's truck at a Walmart parking lot and flagged down an SUV for a ride home. Police later found Brown and McGlothen at the nearby InTown Suites.

In a letter asking Governor Haslam to deny clemency, the lead detective in the case of Allen's murder wrote that on August 7, Brown had a neighbor drive her to the Walmart where she had left Allen's truck. The detective says that Brown asked the neighbor to drive her back to Allen's house so that she could steal more items but he refused. The neighbor reportedly told the detective that Brown told him that she “shot somebody in the head for fifty thousand dollars and some guns” and that she "shot somebody in the head last night and blew his brains out." The detective further asserted that Brown told the neighbor that the killing was a "fat lick" (robbery) and that she had been "waiting on a lick like that all week." According to the detective, after the neighbor told his roommate about the incident Brown called him on the phone and threatened him, saying “you better stop running your fucking mouth about my business or I’ll get to you too.”

Arrest and trial

Brown was arrested and charged with homicide, aggravated robbery, handgun possession, and criminal impersonation. Despite being only 16 at the time of the killing, she was tried as an adult. This decision came from Metro Juvenile Court Judge Betty Adams Green on November 14, 2004, who argued that it was too much of a risk to the community to keep the 16-year-old in the Juvenile Court System.

Brown never denied shooting Allen; rather, she argued that the act was committed in self defense. 
Brown stated that Allen had intimidated her by repeatedly standing over her and touching her while she lay in his bed, and that she believed Allen was reaching for a firearm as the two lay in bed. No firearm was ever found despite her claims and Allen was discovered in a sleeping position when his body was found. This led her to shoot Allen with her own firearm, which she had gotten from her pimp for protection. Prosecutors took the stance that Brown had not been in danger and that she had murdered Allen as he slept naked in bed in order to rob him.

Evidence presented by the prosecution
Police noted that no gun was found under or near Allen's bed. Based on the position in which his body was discovered, investigators believe that Allen was asleep when he was shot. Forensics noted that postmortem, Allen was lying with his hands underneath his head and his fingers interlocked.

On August 14, Brown was taken to the Western Mental Health Institute for an evaluation. According to court documents, Brown allegedly attacked and threatened a nurse at the Mental Health Institute after the nurse did not allow her to call her adoptive mother. The nurse claimed that Brown jumped over her desk, grabbed her hair and face, and hit her, giving her several bruises and abrasions. During the attack, Brown allegedly told the nurse "I shot that man in the back of the head one time, bitch, I’m gonna shoot you in the back of the head three times. I’d love to hear your blood splatter on the wall." The nurse, along with another Western Mental Health Institute employee who witnessed the incident, testified at trial.

Three jail inmates, hoping to receive leniency in their own pending criminal cases, claimed Brown spoke to them about the crime and confessed to killing Allen "just to see how it felt to kill somebody." One inmate later gave police a note Brown had allegedly given her which said: “everything is the truth, I swear it on my life except for ‘I thought he was getting a gun’ and the feeling of nervousness.” At trial, a forensic document examiner testified that, in his opinion, the note was written by Brown. The cellmate whom Brown had given the note to and spoken with also testified at trial.

Further evidence against Brown came from a phone call between her and her adoptive mother. During the call, Brown said, “I killed somebody. … I executed him.”

Evidence presented by Brown
At trial, defense attorneys argued that 43 year old Allen had a "dark side" and was intent on sexually assaulting 16 year old Brown when he got in the bed with her, naked. The defense stance was that Brown was defending herself against sexual assault when she killed Allen even though evidence proved otherwise. 

During the trial, Brown presented several witnesses on her behalf, including one who had previously interacted with Allen. During one alleged incident, Allen had invited that witness into his home and began kissing her. The witness testified that she told Allen she did not want to have sex. She claimed that Allen then proceeded to rape her. There was another witness, a 17-year-old girl who worked at a restaurant, whom the judge did not allow the jury to hear, labeling her testimony "irrelevant." According to this witness, Allen handed her his business card and wrote a personal message on the back saying, “You’re gorgeous. I’d love to take you out sometime, so let me know.” The witness further testified that other teens who worked at the restaurant felt uncomfortable serving Allen because of his flirtatious behavior with them.

Verdict
Brown was found guilty of first-degree murder, felony murder and aggravated robbery and sentenced to life in prison.
She was 16 when she went to prison.

Incarceration 
Brown served her sentence at the Tennessee Prison for Women, a maximum security detention facility in Nashville, Tennessee. Under her original sentence, she would have been eligible for parole at age 67. In prison, Brown earned her GED with a score of 656 in March 2005, an associate degree in Liberal Arts with a 4.0 GPA in December 2015 from Lipscomb University, and a Bachelors of Professional Studies in Organizational Leadership with a 4.0 GPA in May 2019 from Lipscomb University. She was referenced as a model prisoner in testimony presented at her clemency hearing before the Tennessee Board of Parole.

Brown's former pimp, Garion L. McGlothen, also known as Gary McGlothen and Kut-Throat, died on March 30, 2005, at the age of 24, having been shot and killed by Quartez Hines. His story was featured in the 2011 documentary, Me Facing Life: Cyntoia's Story.

The producer of Me Facing Life: Cyntoia's Story, Dan Birman, continued to follow Brown's case and other instances of juveniles sentenced to long terms in a seven-part online video series in 2016–2017, "Sentencing Children," done in collaboration with the PBS series Independent Lens and reporter Anita Wadhwani at The Tennessean newspaper. Unused footage from these projects was repurposed into a Netflix Original documentary titled, "Murder to Mercy: The Cyntoia Brown Story."

While still in prison, Brown married musician and entrepreneur Jaime Long, CEO of JFAM Music, Inc. and co-owner of a Texas healthcare business who performed under the name J. Long and was formerly associated with the R&B group Pretty Ricky. She is now referred to as Cyntoia Brown Long.

Clemency and appeals 
On November 21, 2017, Brown's case went viral following several high-profile celebrity social media posts expressing outrage over her sentence. Celebrities that posted include Rihanna, Kim Kardashian, T.I., Snoop Dogg, and LeBron James. In March 2018, it was announced that the Tennessee Board of Parole would hold a hearing on Brown's clemency petition, a move that only 2% of Tennessee clemency applicants see. The public hearing was held on May 28, 2018 at the Tennessee Prison for Women. At the hearing, several witnesses that knew Brown from prison testified on her behalf, including Lipscomb University faculty, her former prosecutor Preston Shipp, prison employees, local victim rights advocates, and a local nonprofit leader who ran a mentoring group for at risk teens with Brown. Allen's friend testified against clemency. Charles Robinson, a Nashville police detective who served as the lead detective in Allen's murder investigation, also testified against clemency for Brown. He told the board that he did not believe there was any evidence to support the claim that Brown had been trafficked since she was 12 and that Allen's killing was unjustified. The parole board was divided, with two voting to grant Brown clemency with her having already served 15 years, two voting that Brown's sentence should be reduced from 51 to 25 years, and two voting to deny clemency.

On December 6, 2018, the Tennessee Supreme Court answered a question of law in conjunction with Brown's federal habeas corpus appeal, stating that she would be eligible for parole after serving 51 years. In response to the Tennessee Supreme Court's ruling, a wave of support resurged that encouraged Tennessee Governor Bill Haslam to grant Brown clemency. Letters and phone calls flooded the Governor's office and social media. Detective Charles Robinson wrote a seven-page letter urging Governor Haslam not to give Brown clemency. He wrote that "Cyntoia Brown did not commit this murder because she was a child sex slave as her advocates would like you to believe. Cyntoia Brown's motive for murdering Johnny Allen in his sleep was robbery." He also wrote "At the beginning of this investigation, I considered the possibility that Cyntoia Brown was justified in killing Johnny Allen. At the conclusion of this investigation, my findings were that she was not justified in killing Mr. Allen and her only motivation for the murder was robbery."

On January 7, 2019, Haslam commuted Brown's sentence of life in prison to 15 years plus 10 years of supervised parole. Brown was released from prison on August 7, 2019. Haslam said his decision came "after careful consideration of what is a tragic and complex case" and further stated that "imposing a life sentence on a juvenile that would require her to serve at least 51 years before even being eligible for parole consideration is too harsh." Friends and family of Allen did not approve of Governor Haslam's decision, writing on the Friends of Johnny Allen Facebook page, "Our hearts are broken today as the Governor has decided to grant Johnny's murderer clemency. The activist mob with their repetition of Cyntoia's lies and slander managed to prevail against justice."

Life after prison
Since her release from prison, Cyntoia Brown Long has conducted numerous interviews sharing her insight and critique of the criminal justice system. She has been the featured keynote speaker for different groups across the country, sharing her testimony of surviving domestic minor sex trafficking and her experience with the criminal justice system. She has been commonly referenced as an advocate and activist. The ACLU brought in Brown Long to head their national campaign urging Governors to use their executive power of clemency to combat systemic injustice and racism.

A memoir of Brown's 15 years in prison titled Free Cyntoia: My Search for Redemption in the American Prison System was published by Atria Books on October 15, 2019.

In addition to her own work speaking about her experiences, Brown's life journey has been of interest to notable media giants. A documentary entitled Murder to Mercy: The Cyntoia Brown Story was released on Netflix on April 29, 2020. In August 2020 it was announced that Lala Anthony, burgeoning film producer, actress, and wife of basketball superstar Carmelo Anthony, was working with 50 Cent on a scripted series based on Brown Long.

Brown and her husband founded a nonprofit organization together upon her release. The Foundation for Justice, Freedom, and Mercy operates under the name of The JFAM Foundation and is a 501 (c)(3) organization that aims to empower individuals who are at risk of exploitation or criminal justice system involvement.

Film, television, and radio appearances

See also
 Sara Kruzan

References

External links
 

1988 births
Living people
American female murderers
21st-century American criminals
Criminals from Tennessee
People convicted of murder by Tennessee
Prisoners sentenced to life imprisonment by Tennessee
Violence against men in North America
People from Clarksville, Tennessee
Writers from Tennessee
21st-century American memoirists
21st-century African-American women
21st-century African-American people
21st-century American women writers
American women memoirists
Victims of underage prostitution
Vigilantism against sex offenders
Recipients of American gubernatorial clemency